Radosław Zbierski (born 14 April 1988 in Kędzierzyn-Koźle) is a Polish volleyball player, playing in position libero.

Sporting achievements

Clubs 
Polish Championship I League:
  2007, 2014
Polish Championship:
  2013

References

External links
 PlusLiga profile
 Volleybox profile
 CEV profile

1988 births
People from Kędzierzyn-Koźle
Living people
Polish men's volleyball players
Jastrzębski Węgiel players
Warta Zawiercie players
Czarni Radom players
20th-century Polish people
21st-century Polish people